Francis William Pember JP (16 August 1862 – 19 January 1954) was an English first-class cricketer (a right-handed batsman), lawyer and University of Oxford academic, where he served as Vice-Chancellor.

Francis Pember was the son of Edward Henry Pember KC JP. He was educated at Harrow School (for whom he played cricket) and Balliol College, Oxford, where he matriculated on 21 October 1880. Pember made his first-class debut for Marylebone Cricket Club against his future club Hampshire in 1882. Pember played two further matches for the club, against Oxford University in 1883 and 1885. In the 1883 fixture Pember made his highest first-class score of 47*.

Pember made his debut for Hampshire in the 1885 season, which was Hampshire's last with first-class status until the 1895 County Championship. Pember made his county debut against Surrey at The Oval. Pember's second and final first-class match for the county came against Derbyshire in the 1885 season.

He was called to the bar at Lincoln's Inn, London, in 1889. He was a Fellow of All Souls College, Oxford, from 1884, Estate Bursar from 1910 to 1914, and Warden from 1914 to 1932. He was Vice-Chancellor of Oxford University from 1926 to 1929.

Pember was an Officier Légion d'honneur.

He married in 1895, The Hon. Margaret Bowen Davey, daughter of Horace Davey, Baron Davey.  Their daughter Katharine Pember would marry Charles Galton Darwin in 1925.

Pember died at Newnham, Cambridgeshire on 19 January 1954. He was cremated at Cambridge Crematorium on 24 January 1954.

References

External links
Francis Pember at Cricinfo
Francis Pember at CricketArchive
 Portrait, Oxford
 Pember, Francis William (1862–1954) Warden of All Souls College, Oxford, Janus archive, University of Cambridge

1862 births
1954 deaths
Alumni of Balliol College, Oxford
Cricketers from Hertfordshire
English cricketers
English lawyers
English legal professionals
Fellows of All Souls College, Oxford
Hampshire cricketers
Marylebone Cricket Club cricketers
Officiers of the Légion d'honneur
People educated at Harrow School
People from Hatfield, Hertfordshire
Vice-Chancellors of the University of Oxford
Wardens of All Souls College, Oxford